Peter Wilson (born 9 March 1973 in Melbourne) is an Australian singer, songwriter and producer. His work is heavily influenced by the 1980s Italo disco and the PWL pop sound.

Wilson released a string of singles in Australia between 1994 and 1999, scoring a few hits with the songs "Into the Night" (a cover of the Benny Mardones song) and "I Wanna Dance". However, he retired to focus on writing tracks for other acts such as Amanda Lear and Samantha Fox.

In 2007, Wilson returned with the album Follow Me, released by the UK dance label Klone Records.

In 2010, Wilson signed to another UK label, Energise Records. He got the opportunity to work with the Stock Aitken Waterman associates, engineers Dave Ford and Ian Curnow, who co-wrote and produced tracks on Wilson's next album release Stereo, released in 2011.

Wilson has since released a number of solo albums, the latest being The Great Unknown in 2022.

Wilson has worked with the Dutch producer Matt Pop, Stock Aitken Waterman's head mixmaster Pete Hammond, Norwegian pop team A2E, German spacesynth producer Marco Rochowski, and other producers such as Italoconnection and Mirko Hirsch.

As a songwriter and producer, Wilson has also worked with Amanda Lear, Carol Jiani, Haywoode, Nicki French, Sammy Paul, Massive Ego and Sabrina.

Discography

Albums
Follow Me  (2007)Stereo  (2011)Laser Light  (2012)Pulsation   (2013)Utopia  (2015)Shake It Up  (2015)Overdrive  (2017)The Passion and the Flame  (2018)Change of Heart  (2019)Electricity  (2021)The Great Unknown''  (2022)

Singles

References

External links
 Official Facebook page
 Peter Wilson discography on Discogs

Living people
1973 births
Singers from Melbourne
Australian songwriters
Australian record producers
21st-century Australian singers
21st-century Australian male singers